Diaporthe salicicola is a plant endophyte and occasionally a plant pathogen, first found on Salix purpurea in Australia.

References

Further reading
Gopal, K., et al. "Citrus Melanose (Diaporthe citri Wolf): A Review." Int. J. Curr. Microbiol. App. Sci 3.4 (2014): 113–124.

External links

MycoBank

Fungal plant pathogens and diseases
salicicola